The 14th Battalion, Maratha Light Infantry is a battalion of infantry in the Indian Army. It was initially raised as the 14th/5th Mahratta Light Infantry on 1 February 1941, at Ambala by Lieutenant Colonel E.S. Storey-Cooper, OBE, MC, – a British officer who joined the regiment as a staff captain with 2nd/5th Mahratta Light Infantry on 1 April 1933. The battalion proceeded to Dacca, in Eastern Bengal, for a term of internal security duty in the autumn of the same year. In February 1942 the 14th Battalion moved across India to undergo a period of training at Campbellpore (now known as Attock, Pakistan).

In October 1942 the 14th Battalion embarked for service in the Indian Ocean as the defence garrison of the tiny Addu Atoll, which was a base vital to the air patrol of the sea routes and a possible object of Japanese attack.

At the end of 1943 the Battalion returned to India for a period of special training, in the Ahmednagar and Bombay areas, in amphibious operations with the role of Beach Group to the 33rd Indian Corps. It was during this period, and following the disastrous explosion of April 1944, that the Battalion performed notable service in clearing away the debris from the wrecked Bombay Docks.

In the last weeks of the war in Europe, during February 1945, the 14th Battalion proceeded overseas for service in Iraq (Mesopotamian campaign). Soon after the completion of its tour of duty there, the battalion was disbanded following the end of the Second World War.

Thereafter, the battalion was re-raised as a regular Infantry Battalion, designated the 14th Battalion, Maratha Light Infantry at Belgaum on 1 June 1971, a few months prior to its induction into the Indo-Pakistani War of 1971. Lieutenant Colonel RK Dutt was the first Commanding Officer of the battalion. Since its re-raising, 14 MARATHA LI has served in almost every conceivable type of terrain and operation. The unit has been deployed in the icy heights of North Sikkim, as also the arid Thar Desert. The soldiers have earned a name for themselves and their regiment in every exercise or operation they have been a part of.

Awards and recognitions

Soldiers of the battalion 
Small of stature and casual of appearance, the wiry Mahratta comes of hard stock, is capable of enduring great hardships and privations which they have repeatedly proved in the hardships of the Abyssinian War, in the privations of Mesopotamia, or on the long marches of Allenby's advance through Palestine, and more recently, on the bullet-swept heights of Keren, the mountains of Italy and the jungles of Assam and Burma. The Marathas have an enviable reputation for gallantry and loyal service. They tie the military turban with one fold which falls about the head and down the neck of the soldier in the most capricious convolutions. The Marathas trace their descent to the great 17th-century warrior Shivaji. The Marathas later formed a confederacy and campaigned across vast swathes of India, watered their horses in the Indus, harried the borders of Mysore, and set the scared citizens of Calcutta to digging the Mahratta Ditch.

In recognition of their unsullied reputation for loyalty the Mahratta Light Infantry was, in 1930, formed into a completely class Regiment, one of only three in the British Indian Army of that time, a matter of justifiable pride throughout the Regiment.

Uniform 
The 14th Battalion of the Maratha Light Infantry conforms to all dress regulations that are applicable to other sister battalions of the regiment (less 5 MARATHA LI, which wears a blue lanyard on the right shoulder). The officers and men of the unit also wear a green and red hackle atop their headgear (when in working dress (berets) only).

Sources 
Official battalion history: Ministry of Defence.
Library archives on Maratha Light Infantry, Mumbai.

Bibliography 
A brief history of the Mahratta Light Infantry(1945) by J. S. Barr

References

External links 
Maratha Light Infantry – DefenceIndia.com
Maratha Light Infantry – BharatRakshak.com

Battalions of India

mr:मराठा लाइट इन्फंट्री रेजिमेंट